Sadokat Ruzieva (born 1984) is an Uzbekistani footballer who plays as a defender. She has been a member of the Uzbekistan women's national team.

Early life
Ruzieva was born in Yakkabog, Qashqadaryo Region.

Club career
Ruzieva has played for PFK Sevinch and for Sho'rtan.

International career
Ruzieva capped for Uzbekistan at senior level during two AFC Women's Asian Cup qualifiers (2010 and 2014). She was also a part of the team that competed at the 2012 AFC Women's Olympic Qualifying Tournament.

See also
List of Uzbekistan women's international footballers

References

1984 births
Living people
People from Qashqadaryo Region
Uzbekistani women's futsal players
Uzbekistani women's footballers
Women's association football defenders
Uzbekistan women's international footballers
21st-century Uzbekistani women